The ancient Egyptian official Meketre was chancellor and high steward during the reign of Mentuhotep II, Mentuhotep III and perhaps Amenemhat I, during the Middle Kingdom.Meketre is first attested in a rock inscription in the Wadi Shatt el-Rigala, bearing the simple title sealer. The inscription is dated to year 41 of king Mentuhotep II. On reliefs from the mortuary temple of the same king in Deir el-Bahari Meketre bears the title of chancellor and was evidently promoted in the meantime, succeeding Kheti. The same title was found on a statue in Meketre's tomb while on relief fragments in the tomb he held the main title of high steward. The tomb (TT280) is located in Sheikh Abd el-Qurna, part of the Theban Necropolis, and lies next to a large, unfinished royal tomb which was originally attributed to king Mentuhotep III and, after new research, to Amenemhat I. Therefore, Meketre most likely died under the latter king.

Meketre's tomb TT280 contained several wooden replicas, representing the daily activities and life in Ancient Egypt, together with figurines of ships and cattle were, miniature buildings and gardens. Selections of the replicas and other items from the tomb are on display at the Metropolitan Museum of Art in New York City.

References

Bibliography

 Dorothea Arnold: Amenemhet I and the Early Twelfth Dynasty at Thebes. In: Metropolitan Museum Journal. Vol. 26, 1991, S. 5–48, online (PDF; 7,2 MB).
 H. E. Winlock: Models of Daily Life in Ancient Egypt. From the Tomb of Meket-Re at Thebes (= Publications of the Metropolitan Museum of Art. Egyptian Expedition. Vol. 18). Published for the Metropolitan Museum of Art by Harvard University Press, Cambridge MA 1955.

Ancient Egyptian treasurers
Ancient Egyptian high stewards
Officials of the Eleventh Dynasty of Egypt
Ancient Egyptian royal sealers